Graham Dylan Burke (born 21 September 1993) is an Irish professional footballer who plays as a forward for Shamrock Rovers. Burke has represented the Republic of Ireland at senior level.

Club career

Aston Villa
Burke was born in Dublin. He was first called up to a first-team matchday squad for Aston Villa's 2–0 home defeat against Bolton Wanderers in the third round of the League Cup on 20 September 2011, remaining an unused substitute. On 18 December he was included in the squad for the first time in the Premier League, again unused in a loss by the same score to Liverpool at Villa Park.

He made his senior debut as a 76th-minute substitute for Chris Herd in Villa's 3–0 home win over Tranmere Rovers in the second round of the League Cup on 28 August 2012. Burke was the joint top scorer in the 2012–13 NextGen Series under-19 club tournament, scoring both of Aston Villa's goals in the final which they won.

Loans to Shrewsbury Town and Notts County
Burke joined League One club Shrewsbury Town on a half-season loan on 8 August 2013, and made his Shrewsbury debut in a 3–0 defeat at Leyton Orient two days later. He scored his first senior goal in a 4–1 defeat to Oldham Athletic in the Football League Trophy, however Shrewsbury elected to end his loan spell early in October 2013.

Burke joined Notts County of the same league on an emergency loan on 26 March 2015 until the end of the season. Despite not scoring in his first six matches for the club Burke did make two assists in an important 2–1 win against Doncaster Rovers in the penultimate match of the season on 25 April, keeping County just above the relegation zone. Eight days later in the final game of the season, he scored his first league goal, opening the scoring away to Gillingham, but three late goals by the hosts relegated County to League Two.

Shamrock Rovers
On 15 February 2017, Burke signed for his hometown club Shamrock Rovers, being described by manager Stephen Bradley as an "exciting talent". He made his debut for the club in a 2–1 defeat to Dundalk on 24 February 2017, scoring his side's only goal before being sent off two minutes later after receiving a straight red card following a foul on Dundalk player Jamie McGrath.

In March 2018, Burke scored four goals in one game against Derry City to become the first Rovers player in over 25 years to achieve such a feat and was later named SSE Airtricity/Soccer Writers' Association of Ireland Player of the month for March.

Preston North End
Burke signed for Championship club Preston North End on 13 June 2018 on a three-year contract for an undisclosed fee. Burke joined Aston Villa academy peers Callum Robinson and Daniel Johnson at the club.

Loan to Gillingham
On 31 January 2019, he joined Gillingham on loan.

Return to Shamrock Rovers
On 31 July 2019, Burke re-joined Shamrock Rovers on a one-year loan. 
In February 2020 Burke scored five goals against Cork City 
It was announced on 1 August 2020 that Burke's loan had been extended until the summer of 2021. On 15 March 2021, Shamrock Rovers announced that Burke had signed a pre-contract with the club, with a 3 year permanent contract at the club set to begin on 30 June 2021, when his loan move from Preston North End officially ended. He scored a penalty against ŠK Slovan Bratislava in UEFA Champions League first qualifying round, but Rovers were eliminated 3-2 on aggregate.

European goals
Burke is Rovers’ all-time top goalscorer in European competition

During the 2017–18 UEFA Europa League Burke scored three times against Stjarnan and FK Mladá Boleslav

In the 2020–21 UEFA Europa League he scored against Ilves (football)

In a 2021–22 UEFA Champions League qualifier against ŠK Slovan Bratislava he netted his fifth goal in the Hoops 

In a 2021–22 UEFA Europa Conference League qualifier against FC Flora he netted his sixth goal in the Hoops

International career
Burke has represented the Republic of Ireland from under-17 to under-21 level. In May 2018, Burke received his first call-up to the senior team for a trio of friendlies during May/June 2018. He made a substitute appearance for a Republic of Ireland XI against Celtic in Scott Brown's testimonial match on 20 May 2018. On 28 May 2018, Burke made his full senior international debut for the Republic of Ireland national team in a friendly game against France at the Stade De France when he came on in the 70th minute as a substitute.

Burke scored his first international goal for the Republic of Ireland on 2 June 2018 as Ireland beat the United States 2–1 in Dublin. In doing so, he became the first home-based Irish international goalscorer since April 1978 when Ray Treacy, also of Shamrock Rovers, scored for the Republic of Ireland against Turkey.

His third cap came in a friendly in Poland on the 11th September 2018.

Career statistics

Club

International

International goals
As of match played 11 September 2018. Republic of Ireland score listed first, score column indicates score after each Burke goal.

Honours
Aston Villa Under-19s
NextGen Series: 2012–13

Shamrock Rovers
 League of Ireland (3): 2020, 2021, 2022
 FAI Cup (1): 2019
 President of Ireland's Cup: 2022

Individual
NextGen Series Top-scorer: 2012–13

References

External links

Graham Burke profile  at the Preston North End F.C. website

1993 births
Living people
Association footballers from Dublin (city)
Republic of Ireland association footballers
Republic of Ireland youth international footballers
Republic of Ireland under-21 international footballers
Republic of Ireland international footballers
Association football forwards
Belvedere F.C. players
Aston Villa F.C. players
Shrewsbury Town F.C. players
Notts County F.C. players
Shamrock Rovers F.C. players
Preston North End F.C. players
Gillingham F.C. players
English Football League players
League of Ireland players
Republic of Ireland expatriate association footballers
Expatriate footballers in England
Irish expatriate sportspeople in England